Jalan Broga (Selangor and state route B34 or Negeri Sembilan state route N34) are the major roads in Selangor and Negeri Sembilan, Malaysia.

List of junctions

References

Roads in Selangor
Roads in Negeri Sembilan